Margani Bharat is an Indian politician and actor, serving as a member of parliament to the 17th Lok Sabha from Rajahmundry Lok Sabha constituency, Andhra Pradesh. He won the 2019 Indian general election being a YSR Congress Party candidate. He acted in the Telugu film Oye Ninne.

Early life 
Margani Bharat Ram was born on 12 May 1982 in Thirupathi, Andhra Pradesh. Bharat parents are Margani Nageswara Rao and Margani Prasuna. Bharat graduated from Godavari Degree College, [Rajahmundry]

Personal life 
He married Mona on 12 December 2013. The couple has two daughters.

Political career 
Bharat was involved in politics since his childhood, He became youth leader at a young age. After that he joined YSRCP party and became an MP with a majority of 1,21,634 votes against his nearest rival Telugu Desam Party (TDP) candidate Maganti Rupa. He was appointed as the YSR Congress Party Parliamentary Party Chief Whip on 5 June 2019.

Filmography
He acted  directed and produced in a movie after discontinuing his study in America. That is Oye Ninne Telugu feature film. He participated in many modeling shows like Lakme Fashion Week during his college days.
 Oye Ninne

Awards 
 He Won Bharat Gaurav Award 2018-2019 for social service registered with Niti Ayog
 Govt. of India and won Bharat Youth Award for excellent services during Covid

Other positions held 
Member of the Parliamentary Standing committee on External Affairs in 13 September 2019 – 12 September 2020
Member on Papers Laid on Table (Lok Sabha) in 9 October 2019 onwards
Member of the Parliamentary Standing committee on Transport Tourism and Culture and Member of Consultative Committee for Heavy Industries and Public Enterprises in 13 September 2020 onwards.

References

Living people
India MPs 2019–present
Lok Sabha members from Andhra Pradesh
YSR Congress Party politicians
1982 births